The 2009–10 Ball State Cardinals basketball team represented Ball State University in the college basketball season of 2009–10. The team was coached by Billy Taylor and played their homes game in the John E. Worthen Arena.

Before the season

Roster changes
The Cardinals lost three starters from last year's squad due to graduation.  Of those three seniors, Brandon Lampley was the only one with a double digit Points-per-game statistic, with 10.0 points per game.  Along with him were two other guards from the team, Laron Frazier and Rob Giles.  Along with these three players, Ball State also lost three other players, one of those being Anthony Newell.  Newell was only five points away from breaking 1,000 points within Ball State's men's basketball team when he broke his leg in a 46–42 victory over Eastern Michigan.  Junior Eric Wormely also left the team when he transferred to another college for more playing time. Sophomore KeAundre Peak, who was a key contributor, also transferred and chose Indiana State.

No transfers came in to Ball State for the 2009–2010 season.  All four recruits are new freshmen.

Recruiting

Roster

Coaching staff

Schedule

|-
!colspan=9 style=|Regular season

|-
!colspan=9 style=|MAC tournament

References

Ball State Cardinals men's basketball seasons
Ball State Cardinals